Alingsås HK is a handball club from Alingsås, Sweden. They currently compete in Handbollsligan. They have won two Swedish championships, in 2009 and 2014.

Kits

Achievements
Handbollsligan: 
Winners (2): 2009, 2014
Runners-up (4): 2015, 2016, 2017, 2019

Sports Hall information
Name: Estrad Alingsås
City: Alingsås
Capacity: 2800
Address:  Bryggaregatan 2, 441 30 Alingsås

Team

Current squad
Squad for the 2019-20 season

Goalkeeper
 1  Niklas Kraft
 12  Gustav Skagerling
 16  Pontus Axelsson
 16  Kenan Omerovic

Wingers
LW
 13  Benjamin Helander
 25  Alexander Wedin
 25  Andreas Berg
RW
 4  Samuel Lindberg
 18  Erik Andreasson
 28  Isak Hane

Pivots
 19  Alexander Regen
 22  Axel Franzén
 26  Niclas Barud

Back players
LB
 13  Jacob Lundahl
 13  Daniel Blomgren
 88  Aron Dagur Pálsson
CB
 7  Felix Claar
 11  Fredrik Teern
 31  William Andersson Moberg
RB
 21  Johan Nilsson
 27  Andreas Lang

Technical staff
Staff for the 2019-20 season

 Head Coach:  Mikael Franzén
 Assistant Coach:  Mattias Flodman
 Goalkeeping Coach:  Patrik Karlsson
 Team Leader:  Lena Lindqvist

Former club members

Notable former players

 Mikael Aggefors (2009–2016)
 Marcus Ahlm (1998–2000)
 Niclas Barud (2017–)
 Oscar Bergendahl (2014–2018)
 Felix Claar (2013–2020)
 Max Darj (2009–2017)
 Emil Frend Öfors (2014–2017)
 Jesper Konradsson (2011–2017)
 Gustav Rydergård (2006–2009)

Former coaches

References

External links
 Official website
 

Swedish handball clubs
Sport in Västra Götaland County